Red Lake Falls is a city in Red Lake County, Minnesota, United States. The population was 1,339 at the 2020 census. It is the county seat of Red Lake County. The city lies in the middle of Red Lake Falls Township, from which it was separated when incorporated as a village in 1881. Its status was raised to that of a city in 1898.

History

Red Lake Falls was the site of a North West Company fur post as early as 1796 or 1797, making it one of the oldest sites of European occupation in the State of Minnesota.  A French Canadian fur trader, Jean Baptiste Cadotte, partner of the noted British-Canadian fur trader, Alexander Henry the elder, established the post as part of a strategy to ward off Hudson's Bay Company intrusion into the Red River Valley. The famous Canadian explorer David Thompson took shelter from a storm in Cadotte's cabin here in March 1798.<ref>See D'Arcy Jenish, Epic Wanderer: David Thompson & The Mapping of the Canadian West (2003), at pages 103-04</ref> The post was abandoned early in the 1800s, as British fur traders withdrew from United States territory.

The surrounding territory was homesteaded by French-American settlers led by Pierre Bottineau, who were relocating via ox cart from their temporary stopping points in Ramsey and Hennepin Counties, Minnesota, in 1876.  These pioneers were augmented in 1878 by a number of French Canadian settlers from Upper Canada.  The area developed as a grain farming region.  In 1878, Earnest Buse and his partner, Otto Kankel, established a flour mill at the confluence of the two rivers.

The town of Red Lake Falls soon after was platted by Mr. Buse, who then moved on to other environs. The Kankel family continued as a prominent presence in the town through the 1950s.  The town prospered for a time, as both the Northern Pacific Railway and the Great Northern Railway ran their lines through the town in the 1880s and early 1890s (both lines are now abandoned), and when Red Lake County split off from Polk County, in 1896, Red Lake Falls became the county seat of the newly formed county, a reason for existence that persists to the present day. The population peaked shortly afterward, in 1900, and has been in decline ever since.

The last significant historic event in Red Lake Falls occurred on August 27, 1927, when the famous aviator Charles Lindbergh and his wife landed at the nearby airport during a barnstorming trip through the Upper Midwest and were taken on automobile rides to Huot and Crookston.

Geography
Red Lake Falls is located on a tributary of the Red River of the North, the Red Lake River, at its confluence with the Clearwater River.

Minnesota Highway 32 serves as a main route in the city. Minnesota Highway 92 is nearby.

Climate

Demographics

2010 census
As of the census of 2010, there were 1,427 people, 615 households, and 366 families residing in the city. The racial makeup of the city was 96.1% White, 0.4% African American, 0.5% Native American, 0.3% Pacific Islander, 0.8% from other races, and 2.0% from two or more races. Hispanic or Latino of any race were 4.1% of the population.

There were 615 households, of which 29.6% had children under the age of 18 living with them, 47.0% were married couples living together, 9.3% had a female householder with no husband present, 3.3% had a male householder with no wife present, and 40.5% were non-families. 33.7% of all households were made up of individuals, and 14.4% had someone living alone who was 65 years of age or older. The average household size was 2.27 and the average family size was 2.90.

The median age in the city was 41.2 years. 24.7% of residents were under the age of 18; 7.2% were between the ages of 18 and 24; 22.6% were from 25 to 44; 27.8% were from 45 to 64; and 17.7% were 65 years of age or older. The gender makeup of the city was 49.5% male and 50.5% female.

2000 census
As of the census of 2000, there were 1,590 people, 608 households, and 380 families residing in the city. The racial makeup of the city was 94.53% White, 4.53% Native American, 0.13% Asian, 0.31% from other races, and 0.50% from two or more races. Hispanic or Latino of any race were 0.44% of the population.

There were 608 households, out of which 33.1% had children under the age of 18 living with them, 49.2% were married couples living together, 9.5% had a female householder with no husband present, and 37.5% were non-families. 32.7% of all households were made up of individuals, and 16.6% had someone living alone who was 65 years of age or older.  The average household size was 2.35 and the average family size was 3.00.

In the city, the population was spread out, with 25.4% under the age of 18, 8.2% from 18 to 24, 24.5% from 25 to 44, 20.4% from 45 to 64, and 21.5% who were 65 years of age or older.  The median age was 39 years. For every 100 females, there were 92.0 males.  For every 100 females age 18 and over, there were 87.7 males.

The median income for a household in the city was $30,536, and the median income for a family was $41,413. Males had a median income of $29,792 versus $20,185 for females. The per capita income for the city was $15,177.  About 8.3% of families and 11.4% of the population were below the poverty line, including 11.3% of those under age 18 and 16.9% of those age 65 or over.

Politics

{| align="center" border="2" cellpadding="4" cellspacing="0" style="float:right; margin: 1em 1em 1em 0; border: 1px #aaa solid; border-collapse: collapse; font-size: 95%;"
|+ 2020 Precinct Results Spreadsheet
|+ 2016 Precinct Results Spreadsheet
|+ 2012 Precinct Results Spreadsheet
|+ 2008 Precinct Results Spreadsheet
|+ 2004 Precinct Results Spreadsheet
|+ 2000 Precinct Results Spreadsheet
|+ 1996 Precinct Results
|+ 1992 Precinct Results
|+ 1988 Precinct Results
|+ 1984 Precinct Results
|+ 1980 Precinct Results
|+ 1976 Precinct Results
|+ 1968 Precinct Results
|+ 1964 Precinct Results
|+ 1960 Precinct Results
|- bgcolor=lightgrey
! Year
! Republican
! Democratic
! Third parties
|-
|  style="text-align:center;" |2020
|  style="text-align:center;" |63.6% 437
|  style="text-align:center;" |34.6% 238
|  style="text-align:center; background:honeyDew;"|1.8% 12
|-
|  style="text-align:center;" |2016
|  style="text-align:center;" |58.6% 371
|  style="text-align:center;" |30.2% 191
|  style="text-align:center; background:honeyDew;"|11.2% 71
|-
|  style="text-align:center;" |2012
|  style="text-align:center;" |46.2% 308
|  style="text-align:center;" |50.8% 339
|  style="text-align:center; background:honeyDew;"|3.0% 20
|-
|  style="text-align:center;" |2008
|  style="text-align:center;" |43.2% 315
|  style="text-align:center;" |53.5% 390
|  style="text-align:center; background:honeyDew;"|3.3% 24
|-
|  style="text-align:center;" |2004
|  style="text-align:center;" |50.1% 354
|  style="text-align:center;" |48.1% 340
|  style="text-align:center; background:honeyDew;"|1.8% 13
|-
|  style="text-align:center;" |2000
|  style="text-align:center;" |46.0% 329
|  style="text-align:center;" |43.8% 313
|  style="text-align:center; background:honeyDew;"|10.2% 73
|-
|  style="text-align:center;" |1996
|  style="text-align:center;" |26.4% 183
|  style="text-align:center;" |57.1% 396
|  style="text-align:center; background:honeyDew;"|16.5% 115
|-
|  style="text-align:center;" |1992
|  style="text-align:center;" |31.2% 215
|  style="text-align:center;" |49.2% 339
|  style="text-align:center; background:honeyDew;"|19.6% 135
|-
|  style="text-align:center;" |1988
|  style="text-align:center;" |40.3% 261
|  style="text-align:center;" |59.7% 387
|  style="text-align:center; background:honeyDew;"|0.0% 0
|-
|  style="text-align:center;" |1984
|  style="text-align:center;" |46.7% 347
|  style="text-align:center;" |53.3% 396
|  style="text-align:center; background:honeyDew;"|0.0% 0
|-
|  style="text-align:center;" |1980
|  style="text-align:center;" |44.8% 375
|  style="text-align:center;" |49.2% 412
|  style="text-align:center; background:honeyDew;"|6.0% 50
|-
|  style="text-align:center;" |1976
|  style="text-align:center;" |33.1% 284
|  style="text-align:center;" |63.5% 545
|  style="text-align:center; background:honeyDew;"|3.4% 29
|-
|  style="text-align:center;" |1968
|  style="text-align:center;" |32.4% 229
|  style="text-align:center;" |63.4% 448
|  style="text-align:center; background:honeyDew;"|4.2% 30
|-
|  style="text-align:center;" |1964
|  style="text-align:center;" |26.6% 191
|  style="text-align:center;" |72.1% 517
|  style="text-align:center; background:honeyDew;"|1.3% 9
|-
|  style="text-align:center;" |1960
|  style="text-align:center;" |31.1% 210
|  style="text-align:center;" |68.9% 446
|  style="text-align:center; background:honeyDew;"|0.0% 0
|}

Notable people
 Adrian Baril, NFL player
 Roxy Beaudro, ice hockey player

References

Further reading
 Red Lake County Historical Society, Inc., A History of Red Lake County (1976), pp. 108–138.

External links

 City website
 History of Red Lake County
 Official Red Lake County website
 

Cities in Red Lake County, Minnesota
Cities in Minnesota
County seats in Minnesota